The 2020 Liga 4 was the second season of fourth-tier football in Georgia under its current title. The matches were supposed to begin in April, but due to the COVID-19 restrictions it was postponed until 15 August. The season ended on 18 December.

Team changes
The following teams have changed division since the previous season:

To Liga 4

Relegated from Liga 3:

Borjomi ● Betlemi Keda

Promoted from Regionuli Liga

Didube Tbilisi • Iberia Tbilisi • Merani Tbilisi-2 • Skuri Tsalenjikha • Sulori Vani • WIT Georgia-2 • Zestafoni

From Liga 4

Promoted to Liga 3

Spaeri Tbilisi • Tbilisi City

Relegated to Regionuli Liga

None

Teams, results and league tables

The season was due to be conducted as a single two-round competition. However, before the season started in August, the Football Federation decided to change the format and split the sixteen teams into White and Red groups.

White Group

Red Group

Notes: 

• Despite being formally registered in Marneuli, FC Algeti played their all home matches in Tbilisi.

References

External links
Georgian Football Federation

Liga 4 (Georgia) seasons
4
Georgia
Georgia